Erwin Blynn Nguéma Obame (born 7 March 1989 in Bitam) is a Gabonese football player who currently plays for US Bitam.

Career
Obame began his career with US Bitam and signed than in summer 2009 for Cameroonian top club Cotonsport Garoua.

International career
He was part of the Gabon national football team at 2010 African Cup of Nations in Angola.

References

1989 births
Living people
Gabonese footballers
Gabon international footballers
2010 Africa Cup of Nations players
Coton Sport FC de Garoua players
Expatriate footballers in Cameroon
US Bitam players
People from Woleu-Ntem Province
Gabonese expatriate footballers
Association football defenders
21st-century Gabonese people
Gabon A' international footballers
2014 African Nations Championship players
Gabonese expatriate sportspeople in Cameroon